Douglas Bruce Macdonald (born February 8, 1969) is a Canadian former professional ice hockey player.

He was drafted in the fourth round, 77th overall, in the 1989 NHL Entry Draft by the Buffalo Sabres. He played fifteen games in the National Hockey League with the Sabres, scoring one goal. He is currently a pro scout for the Columbus Blue Jackets.

Personal
Macdonald attended University of Wisconsin, majored in Political Science. He named Mark Messier as his favorite player. He was born to Ian Macdonald and wife Fay Macdonald.

Career statistics

Awards and honors

References

External links

1969 births
People from Assiniboia, Saskatchewan
Belfast Giants players
Buffalo Sabres draft picks
Buffalo Sabres players
Canadian ice hockey centres
Cincinnati Cyclones (IHL) players
Columbus Blue Jackets scouts
Delta Flyers players
Essen Mosquitoes players
Ice hockey people from Saskatchewan
Kölner Haie players
Langley Eagles players
Living people
Rochester Americans players
Wisconsin Badgers men's ice hockey players
Canadian expatriate ice hockey players in Northern Ireland
Canadian expatriate ice hockey players in Germany
NCAA men's ice hockey national champions
Canadian expatriate ice hockey players in the United States